The following is a list of notable deaths in September 2015.

Entries for each day are listed alphabetically by surname. A typical entry lists information in the following sequence:
Name, age, country of citizenship and reason for notability, established cause of death, reference.

September 2015

1
Bouteldja Belkacem, 68, Algerian singer and composer.
Frank Brennan, 67, Irish economist.
Boomer Castleman, 70, American singer-songwriter and guitarist, inventor of the palm pedal, cancer.
Gurgen Dalibaltayan, 89, Armenian colonel-general.
Eric H. Davidson, 78, American biologist, heart attack.
Antonio Deinde Fernandez, 79, Nigerian diplomat.
Richard G. Hewlett, 92, American public historian.
Don Holder, 86, American Olympic gymnast.
Dean Jones, 84, American actor (The Love Bug, Company, Beethoven), Parkinson's disease.
Ben Kuroki, 98, American bomber crewman.
Jiří Louda, 94, Czech heraldist, designer of the current Coat of arms of the Czech Republic.
Hanna Mierzejewska, 65, Polish politician.
Takuma Nakahira, 77, Japanese photographer.
Antonio Nirta, 96, Italian organized crime boss ('Ndrangheta San Luca).
Abdul Hafeez Pirzada, 80, Pakistani politician and lawyer.
Will Provine, 73, American science historian, brain tumor.
Robert Ravenstahl, 90, American politician, member of the Pennsylvania House of Representatives (1975–1978).
Aleksandar Stipčević, 84, Croatian historian of the Illyrians.
Jacek Wierzchowiecki, 71, Polish Olympic equestrian.

2
John E. Boland, 78, American politician, member of the Minnesota House of Representatives (1971–1973).
Suheil Bushrui, 85, Lebanese academic.
Lindsay Collins, 71, Australian marine geologist.
Avinash Deobhakta, 78, Indian-born New Zealand jurist.
Boudjemaâ El Ankis, 88, Algerian musician.
Ephraim Engleman, 104, American rheumatologist.
Henry Gleitman, 90, German-born American psychologist.
Charles Gyamfi, 85, Ghanaian football player (Fortuna Düsseldorf) and coach (national team).
Stan Kane, 86, Scottish actor (Storm).
Piero Livi, 90, Italian film director.
Aleksander Mandziara, 75, Polish football player and coach.
Stewart McCrae, 85, Canadian politician, member of the Legislative Assembly of Alberta (1973–1982).
Manos Nathan, 67, New Zealand artist, leukaemia.
Giuseppe Petitto, 46, Italian film director.
Brianna Lea Pruett, 32, American singer and songwriter, suicide.
William Arbuckle Reid, 82, British curriculum theorist.
Simo Salminen, 82, Finnish comic actor.

3
Wayne D. Bennett, 87, American politician, member of the Iowa House of Representatives (1973–1993) and Senate (1993–1997).
Gabrielle Burton, 76, American novelist, pancreatic cancer.
Sir Adrian Cadbury, 86, British businessman and rower, chairman of Cadbury.
Judy Carne, 76, British actress and comedian (Rowan & Martin's Laugh-In), pneumonia.
Stanton R. Cook, 90, American chief executive (Chicago Tribune).
Chandra Bahadur Dangi, 75, Nepalese primordial dwarf, shortest man in recorded history, pneumonia.
Harold Drasdo, 85, English rock climber and writer.
Giltedge, 29, Irish-born American eventing horse.
Dan Eley, 100, British chemist (Eley-Rideal mechanism).
Claude Flahault, 92, French Olympic sailor.
Leon Gorman, 80, American businessman, President (1967–2001) and chairman (2001–2013) of L.L.Bean, cancer.
Ken Horne, 89, English footballer (Brentford).
Carter Lay, 44, American businessman and philanthropist, heir to Frito-Lay.
Leland McPhie, 101, American masters athlete.
John Noah, 87, American ice hockey player, Olympic silver medalist (1952), Alzheimer's disease.
Jean-Luc Préel, 74, French politician, member of the French National Assembly for Vendée (1988–2012).
Andrew Sibley, 81, Australian painter.
Daniel Thompson, 94, Canadian-born American inventor, creator of the automatic bagel maker and the folding ping pong table.
Yevgeny Ukhnalyov, 83, Russian artist, co-creator of the current coat of arms of Russia.
John Waller, 91, British Anglican prelate, Bishop of Stafford (1979–1987).
Binny Yanga, 57, Indian social worker and activist.
Zhang Zhen, 100, Chinese general.

4
Geoffrey Bolton, 83, Australian historian.
Graham Brazier, 63, New Zealand musician and songwriter (Hello Sailor), heart attack.
Antonio Ciciliano, 82, Italian sailor, Olympic bronze medalist (1960).
Frédéric Comte, 39, French rally driver, car crash.
Jean Darling, 93, American silent film actress (Our Gang), radio personality and author.
Eldon Johnson, 85, American politician, member of the Oregon House of Representatives (1977–1999), stroke.
Sylvie Joly, 80, French actress and comedian (Going Places, Get Out Your Handkerchiefs), heart attack.
Rainer Kirsch, 81, German author and poet.
Max Kruse, 93, German novelist.
Sara Little Turnbull, 97, American product designer.
Claus Moser, Baron Moser, 92, German-born British statistician, stroke.
Warren Murphy, 81, American author (The Destroyer) and screenwriter (Lethal Weapon 2, The Eiger Sanction).
Rico Rodriguez, 80, Cuban-born British trombonist (The Specials).
Joel Rufino dos Santos, 74, Brazilian historian and writer.
Wilfred de Souza, 88, Indian politician, Chief Minister of Goa (1993–1994, 1998).
Egon Sundberg, 104, Swedish footballer.
Duane Weiman, 69, Canadian politician, member of the Legislative Assembly of Saskatchewan (1982–1986).
Hal Willis, 82, Canadian country singer (The Lumberjack).
Jonathan Woolf, 54, British architect.
Cyril Zuma, 30, South African footballer, traffic collision.

5
Ilja Bergh, 88, Danish pianist and composer.
Antonio Dalmonte, 96, Italian footballer (Juventus F.C., Atalanta B.C.).
Avery Dennis Sr., 86, American tribal politician and substance abuse counselor, Trustee of the Shinnecock Indian Nation.
Gene Elston, 93, American Major League Baseball broadcaster (Houston Astros).
Goh Eng Wah, 92, Malaysian-born Singaporean film distributor.
Dennis Greene, 66, American singer (Sha Na Na), actor, movie studio executive and law professor, esophageal cancer.
Peter D. Hannaford, 82, American public relations consultant.
Setsuko Hara, 95, Japanese actress, pneumonia.
Jacques Israelievitch, 67, French-born Canadian violinist.
Yotaro Kobayashi, 82, English-born Japanese businessman (Fuji Xerox), chronic empyema.
Alacid Nunes, 90, Brazilian politician, Governor of Pará (1966–1971, 1979–1983).
Aadesh Shrivastava, 51, Indian composer and singer, cancer.
Alan Steel, 79, Italian bodybuilder and actor (Samson, The Rebel Gladiators, Hercules Against the Moon Men).
Chester Stranczek, 85, American politician, Mayor of Crestwood, Illinois (1969–2007).
Fagaoalii Satele Sunia, 69, American Samoan literacy advocate, First Lady (1997–2003), stroke.
Peter Alfred Sutton, 80, Canadian Roman Catholic prelate, Archbishop of Keewatin–Le Pas (1986–2006).
RO Tambunan, 80, Indonesian lawyer.
Patricia Canning Todd, 93, American tennis player.
Ivan Voshchyna, 57, Ukrainian drummer.

6
Beverly Daggett, 69, American politician, member (1996–2004) and President (2003–2004) of the Maine Senate, polycystic kidney disease.
Bastien Damiens, 20, French canoeist, European kayaking champion (2012), fall.
Richard E. Flathman, 81, American political theorist.
Rufus Hollis Gause, 90, American theologian.
Åke Hansson, 88, Swedish footballer (Malmö FF).
Jack Linn, 48, American football player (Detroit Lions), motorcycle accident.
Thor-Erik Lundby, 78, Norwegian Olympic ice hockey player (1964).
Herbert Mayr, 72, Italian politician.
Ralph Milne, 54, Scottish footballer (Dundee United, Manchester United), liver disease.
Martin Milner, 83, American actor (Adam-12, Route 66, Sweet Smell of Success), heart failure.
Harald Norbelie, 70, Swedish writer and journalist, prostate cancer.
Fred Ohr, 96, American World War II flying ace.
Nelson Peery, 92, American political activist and author.
John Perreault, 78, American art critic and poet, complications from gastrointestinal surgery.
Allen Roberts, 92, New Zealand cricketer.
Barney Schultz, 89, American baseball player (Chicago Cubs, St. Louis Cardinals).
Muhammad Shah Rukh, 88, Pakistani Olympic field hockey player (1948) and cyclist (1956).
Gaylord Shaw, 73, American journalist.
Calvin J. Spann, 90, American fighter pilot (Tuskegee Airmen).
Vladislav Timakov, 22, Russian water polo player, heart attack.
Peter Walker, 65, British Royal Air Force officer, Lieutenant Governor of Guernsey (since 2011).
Petraq Zoto, 77, Albanian writer.

7
Susan Allen, 64, American harpist, brain cancer.
Elena Arnedo, 74, Spanish gynecologist, writer and women's rights activist.
Cor Edskes, 90, Dutch organ builder and restorer.
Jorge Alberto Garramuño, 61, Argentine politician, Senator (since 2013).
Leon Gordis, 81, American epidemiologist.
George Guida, 93, American Olympic sprinter (1948).
Jane Hill, 79, Australian politician, member of the Victorian Legislative Assembly for Frankston (1982–1985) and Frankston North (1985–1992).
Dickie Moore, 89, American child actor (Our Gang, Sergeant York, Oliver Twist).
Sigifredo Nájera Talamantes, Mexican drug cartel leader (Los Zetas), heart attack.
Candida Royalle, 64, American Hall of Fame pornographic actress, producer and director, ovarian cancer.
Guillermo Rubalcaba, 88, Cuban pianist, bandleader and composer.
José María Ruiz Mateos, 84, Spanish businessman and politician.
Rebecca Shaw, 83, English author, stroke.
Sowkoor Jayaprakash Shetty, 80, Indian politician.
Leonard Silverman, 84, American politician and judge.
Turdakun Usubalijev, 95, Kyrgyz Soviet politician.
Mitrasen Yadav, 81, Indian politician, convicted embezzler and pardoned double murderer.
Voula Zouboulaki, 90, Egyptian-born Greek actress.

8
Merv Adelson, 85, American television producer, cancer.
Habil Aliyev, 88, Azerbaijani musician, heart and lung failure.
Joaquín Andújar, 62, Dominican baseball player (Houston Astros, St. Louis Cardinals), complications from diabetes.
Ron Beagle, 81, American football player.
Erlinda Cortes, 91, Filipino actress.
Willi Fuggerer, 73, German track cyclist, Olympic bronze medalist (1964).
Ebby Halliday, 104, American realtor and businesswoman.
Teri Harangozó, 72, Hungarian singer.
Basil H. Johnston, 86, Canadian writer.
Ferenc Kiss, 73, Hungarian wrestler, Olympic bronze medalist (1972).
Andrew Kohut, 73, American political scientist, leukemia.
Bettina Le Beau, 83, Belgian-born British actress (Dr. No).
Peeter Luksep, 60, Swedish politician, MP (1991–1994).
Tyler Sash, 27, American football player (New York Giants), accidental drug overdose.
Carlo Schäfer, 51, German author.
Miroslav Josić Višnjić, 69, Serbian writer.
Smokey Wilson, 79, American blues guitarist.
Robert Wylie, 67, New Zealand cricketer.
Joost Zwagerman, 51, Dutch author, suicide.

9
John Allen, 83, British Anglican priest, Provost of Wakefield (1982–1997).
Annemarie Bostroem, 93, German writer.
Lane Bray, 86, American politician, member of the Washington House of Representatives (1991–1995).
Gabriel Fragnière, 81, Swiss academic.
Green Desert, 32, American Thoroughbred racehorse, euthanized.
Charles Hallac, 50, American businessman (BlackRock), colorectal cancer.
Leina'ala Kalama Heine, 75, American hula dancer.
Einar H. Ingman, Jr., 85, American Army Medal of Honor recipient (Korean War).
K. Kunaratnam, 81, Sri Lankan academic.
Fernando Di Laura Frattura, 83, Italian politician, President of Molise (1988–1990), member of the Chamber of Deputies (1992–1994).
Jørgen Sonne, 89, Danish writer.

10
Philip Amm, 51, South African cricketer.
John Connell, 91, American actor (Young Doctor Malone, Fail Safe, Family Business).
Norman Farberow, 97, American psychologist, pioneer of suicidology.
Adrian Frutiger, 87, Swiss type designer.
José María Gamazo, 86, Spanish politician.
Ihab Hassan, 89, Egyptian-born American literary theorist.
Franco Interlenghi, 83, Italian actor (I Vitelloni, I Vinti).
Kärt Jänes-Kapp, 55, Estonian journalist and editor.
Antoine Lahad, 88, Lebanese military officer, leader of South Lebanon Army (1984–2000), heart attack.
Bengt Nyholm, 85, Swedish footballer.
Radim Palouš, 90, Czech dissident.
James E. Proctor, Jr., 79, American politician, member of the Maryland House of Delegates (since 1990).
Alberto Schommer, 87, Spanish photographer.
Colleen Waata Urlich, 75, New Zealand ceramicist.
Gert Wilden, 98, German film composer.

11
Rezo Cheishvili, 82, Georgian writer.
Vincenzo Dall'Osso, 86, Italian boxer.
Bárbara Gil, 85, Mexican actress (Seven Women).
Vernon Hauser, 87, Australian politician, member of the Victorian Legislative Council (1970–1982).
Fred Lucas, 81, English cricketer.
Roy Marble, 48, American basketball player (Iowa Hawkeyes, Atlanta Hawks, Denver Nuggets), lung cancer.
Marcelo Moren Brito, 80, Chilean agent of Dirección de Inteligencia Nacional, head of Villa Grimaldi, convicted of crimes against humanity (Caravan of Death), multisystem failure.
Knut Næss, 88, Norwegian football player and coach (Rosenborg BK).
Jaswant Singh Neki, 90, Indian academic and poet.
Lawrence S. Phillips, 88, American philanthropist.
Alan Purwin, 53, American helicopter pilot and aerial film operator (Transformers, Star Trek, Jurassic World), plane crash.
Kerry Simon, 60, American chef, multiple system atrophy.
Ray Smolover, 94, American opera director and hazzan.
Bruno Stutz, 77, Swiss clown.

12
Deborah Asnis, 59, American infectious disease specialist, discovered the first cases of West Nile virus in the United States, breast cancer.
Max Beauvoir, 79, Haitian houngan and biochemist.
William J. Becker, 88, American theater critic and film distributor (Janus Films), complications of kidney failure.
Melvin Bernhardt, 84, American theater director, fall.
Claudia Card, 74, American philosopher, lung cancer.
Arrigo Delladio, 86, Italian Olympic cross-country skier (1952).
Valentin Dzhonev, 63, Bulgarian Olympic athlete.
John Emerton, 87, British Hebraist, Regius Professor of Hebrew at Cambridge University (1968–1995).
Frank D. Gilroy, 89, American playwright and screenwriter.
Malcolm Graham, 81, English footballer (Barnsley, Leyton Orient, Queens Park Rangers).
Kenneth Leech, 76, British Anglican priest and theologian, founded Centrepoint.
Maciek Malish, 53, Polish-born American sound editor (The X-Files, Lost, Starship Troopers), traffic collision.
Bill H. McAfee, 84, American radio (WCGA) and TV (WTVC) broadcaster and politician, member of the Tennessee House of Representatives (1976–2000).
Bryn Merrick, 56, Welsh bassist (The Damned), cancer.
Al Monchak, 98, American baseball player (Philadelphia Phillies) and coach (Pittsburgh Pirates).
Aronda Nyakairima, 56, Ugandan army officer and politician, Chief of Defence Forces (2003–2013), Minister of Internal Affairs (since 2013), heart attack.
Neil Rosendorff, 70, South African cricketer.
Salvo, 68, Italian artist.
Bernard Secly, 84, French horse trainer.
Ron Springett, 80, English footballer (Sheffield Wednesday).
Zhang Xu, 101, Chinese telecommunications engineer.

13
Sir Jim Belich, 88, New Zealand politician, Mayor of Wellington (1986–1992).
Erma Bergmann, 91, American baseball player (AAGPBL) (1946–1951).
Brown Panther, 7, British Thoroughbred racehorse, euthanized after race injury.
Brian Close, 84, English cricketer (Yorkshire, Somerset, England).
Georges de Paris, 81, French-born American tailor.
Stanley Hoffmann, 86, Austrian-born French scholar.
Jane Jacobs, 91, American baseball player (AAGPBL).
Howie Johnson, 90, American golf player.
Betty Judge, 94, Australian runner and coach.
Betty Lago, 60, Brazilian actress, gallbladder cancer.
Moses Malone, 60, American Hall of Fame basketball player (Philadelphia 76ers, Houston Rockets), atherosclerosis.
Barrie Meyer, 83, English footballer (Bristol Rovers, Bristol City, Plymouth Argyle), cricket player (Gloucestershire) and umpire.
Raymond Mould, 74, British property developer and racehorse owner.
Ian Payne, 65, South African cricketer.
Gord Pennell, 86, Canadian ice hockey player (Buffalo Bisons).
Jay Scott Pike, 91, American cartoonist and illustrator.
Gary Richrath, 65, American guitarist and songwriter (REO Speedwagon).
Kalamandalam Satyabhama, 77, Indian dancer.
Carl Emil Schorske, 100, American cultural historian, winner of the Pulitzer Prize for General Non-Fiction (1981).
Ted Smith, 95, British nature conservationist.
Vivinho, 54, Brazilian footballer (Vasco).

14
Davey Browne, 28, Australian boxer, head injuries sustained in a bout.
Fred DeLuca, 67, American businessman, co-founder of Subway, leukemia.
Bill Golden, 81, American drag racer.
Indika Gunawardena, 72, Sri Lankan politician, Minister of Higher Education.
Martin Kearns, 38, British drummer (Bolt Thrower).
Bob Ledger, 77, English footballer (Huddersfield Town, Oldham Athletic, Mansfield Town).
Steve Meilinger, 84, American football player (Washington Redskins, Green Bay Packers, Pittsburgh Steelers).
György Mészáros, 82, Hungarian sprint canoeist, Olympic silver medalist (1960).
Mile Novaković, 65, Serbian major general, Commander of the Republic of Serbian Krajina Army (1992–1994).
Hugh O'Neil, 79, Canadian politician, MPP of Ontario (1975–1995).
Adam Purple, 84, American environmental activist, heart attack.
Willy O. Rossel, 94, Swiss-born American chef.
Paweł Sobek, 85, Polish international footballer.
Keith Remfry, 67, British judoka, Olympic silver medallist (1976).
Corneliu Vadim Tudor, 65, Romanian politician, Member of the European Parliament (2009–2014), journalist and editor (România Liberă, AGERPRES), heart attack.
Ali Wardhana, 87, Indonesian economist, Minister of Finance (1966–1983), Coordinating Minister for Economic Affairs (1983–1988).

15
Harry J. Lipkin, 94, Israeli nuclear physicist.
Cor Melchers, 61, Dutch painter, legionnaires' disease.
José María Ortiz de Mendíbil, 89, Spanish football referee.
Meir Pa'il, 89, Israeli politician and military historian, member of the Knesset (1974–1980), complications from Alzheimer's disease.
Tomas Pontén, 69, Swedish actor and director.
Tommy Thompson, 86, English footballer (Aston Villa, Preston North End).
Ian Uttley, 73, New Zealand rugby union player (Auckland, Wellington, Hawke's Bay, national team), traffic collision.
Bernard Van de Kerckhove, 74, Belgian racing cyclist.
Mihai Volontir, 81, Moldovan actor (In the Zone of Special Attention).
Randy Wiles, 64, American baseball player (Chicago White Sox), cancer.

16
Christophe Agou, 46, French photographer, cancer.
David Ashby, 65, British motorcycle speedway rider, cancer.
Guy Béart, 85, French singer-songwriter, heart attack.
Julio Brady, 73, U.S. Virgin Islander judge and politician, Lieutenant Governor (1983–1987).
Bob Cleary, 79, American ice hockey player, Olympic gold medalist (1960).
David Cook, 74, British broadcaster and writer.
Clóvis Fernandes, 60, Brazilian football fan, cancer.
Overton James, 90, American educator and politician, Governor of the Chickasaw Nation (1963–1987).
Peggy Jones, 75, American guitarist (Bo Diddley).
Abolghasem Khazali, 90, Iranian politician and Shi'i ayatollah, co-author of the Constitution of the Islamic Republic of Iran.
Robert Kilpatrick, Baron Kilpatrick of Kincraig, 89, Scottish physician and life peer.
Emma Wong Mar, 89, American political activist.
Ossi Mildh, 85, Finnish Olympic hurdler (1952), (1956).
Peter Molan, 71, Welsh-born New Zealand biochemist, cancer.
Kevin Anthony Morais, 55, Malaysian public prosecutor, homicide.
W. H. Oliver, 90, New Zealand historian and poet.
Kurt Oppelt, 83, Austrian figure skater, Olympic champion (1956).
Niall O'Shaughnessy, 59, Irish Olympic middle distance runner (1976), brain cancer.
Joe Morrone, 79, American soccer coach (Connecticut Huskies).
Ton van de Ven, 71, Dutch industrial designer.
Allan Wright, 95, British World War II flying ace.

17
Ingrīda Andriņa, 71, Latvian stage and film actress.
Peter Barrable, 72, South African cricketer.
Stojan Batič, 90, Slovene sculptor.
Valeria Cappellotto, 45, Italian Olympic racing cyclist (1992, 2000).
Tom Cichowski, 71, American football player (Denver Broncos).
Eddie Connolly, 29, Irish hurler (Tipperary), brain cancer.
Dettmar Cramer, 90, German football manager (Bayern Munich).
Bobby Etheridge, 73, American baseball player (San Francisco Giants).
Milo Hamilton, 88, American Hall of Fame sportscaster (Houston Astros).
Sir Peter Heatly, 91, Scottish Olympic diver (1948, 1952), chairman of the Commonwealth Games Federation.
Danilo Jovanovitch, 96, Australian poet and actor.
Vadim Kuzmin, 78, Russian theoretical physicist.
Joe Maiden, 74, British horticulturist, prostate cancer.
Carlos Manga, 87, Brazilian film director.
D. M. Marshman Jr., 92, American screenwriter (Sunset Boulevard).
Bal Pandit, 86, Indian cricket player, writer and commentator.
Everett Parker, 102, American civil rights activist.
Mikhail Remizov, 66, Russian actor.
Nelo Risi, 95, Italian poet and film director (A Season in Hell).
Bruno Tommasi, 85, Italian Roman Catholic prelate, Archbishop of Lucca (1991–2005).
Sir David Willcocks, 95, British choirmaster, director of music at Choir of King's College, Cambridge.
Eraclio Zepeda, 78, Mexican author and politician.

18
Nancy Bernstein, 55, American visual effects and film producer (The Lord of the Rings: The Fellowship of the Ring, X-Men, Rise of the Guardians), colorectal cancer.
Eduardo Bonvallet, 60, Chilean footballer (Universidad de Chile, national team) and commentator, suicide by hanging.
James R. Houck, 74, American astrophysicist.
John A. Jane, 84, American neurosurgeon.
Holger Karlsson, 80, Swedish Olympic ski jumper.
Moe Mantha, Sr., 81, Canadian ice hockey player and politician, MP (1984–1988).
Mario Menéndez, 85, Argentine military officer, Military Governor of the Falkland Islands (1982).
William E. Paul, 79, American immunologist and AIDS researcher, acute myeloid leukemia.
Jim Ross, 87, Australian football player (St Kilda).
Czesław Ryll-Nardzewski, 88, Polish mathematician.
Freddy Ternero, 53, Peruvian football player and manager, kidney cancer.
Marcin Wrona, 42, Polish film and television director (Demon, Medics), suicide by hanging.

19
Rashid bin Mohammed Al Maktoum, 33, Emirati prince, businessman and endurance runner, heart attack.
Hannah Idowu Dideolu Awolowo, 99, Nigerian businesswoman and politician.
Enrique Ballesté, 68, Mexican theatre director.
James Rodger Brandon, 88, American academic.
Mishael Cheshin, 79, Israeli judge, member of the Supreme Court (1992–2006), cancer.
Jackie Collins, 77, British-American novelist, breast cancer.
Georg Eder, 87, Austrian Roman Catholic prelate, Archbishop of Salzburg (1989–2002).
Todd Ewen, 49, Canadian ice hockey player (St. Louis Blues, Montreal Canadiens, Mighty Ducks of Anaheim), suicide by gunshot.
Miki Gorman, 80, Japanese-born American marathon runner, cancer.
Sadhan Gupta, 97, Indian lawyer and politician.  
Ismael Kiram II, 76, Philippine sultan, Regent of Sulu (since 2001), kidney failure.
Bill Larson, 77, American football player (Boston Patriots).
Alan Magill, 61, American medical researcher.
Winton W. Marshall, 96, American air force lieutenant general.
Eugenio Mayer, 75, Italian Olympic skier.
Brian Sewell, 84, British art critic.
Masajuro Shiokawa, 93, Japanese politician, Minister of Finance (2001–2003), pneumonia.
Herschel Silverman, 89, American Beat poet.
Walter Young, 35, American baseball player (Baltimore Orioles), heart attack.

20
Carmen Balcells, 85, Spanish literary agent.
Dorothy Butler, 90, New Zealand children's author, bookseller and reading advocate.
Mario Caiano, 82, Italian film director (My Name Is Shanghai Joe, The Terror of Rome Against the Son of Hercules).
Jagmohan Dalmiya, 75, Indian cricket official, President of International Cricket Council (1997–2000) and Board of Control for Cricket in India (2001–2004), cardiac arrest.
Giovanni De Vivo, 75, Italian Roman Catholic prelate, Bishop of Pescia (since 1993).
Siegfried Gottwald, 72, German mathematician.
Joseph Iannuzzi, 84, American mobster and FBI informant, bone cancer.
Jack Larson, 87, American playwright and actor (Adventures of Superman).
Geoffrey Lilley, 95, British aeronautical scientist.
John Parker, 6th Earl of Morley, 92, British aristocrat, Lord Lieutenant of Devon (1982–1998).
Franz Surges, 57, German composer and musician.
Radhika Thilak, 45, Indian singer, cancer.
C. K. Williams, 78, American poet, winner of the Pulitzer Prize for Poetry (2000), multiple myeloma.

21
Ben Cauley, 67, American trumpet player and singer (The Bar-Kays).
Juliet Clutton-Brock, 82, English zooarchaeologist.
Honey Lee Cottrell, 68, American photographer and filmmaker.
N. Patrick Crooks, 77, American judge, Wisconsin Supreme Court justice (since 1996).
Victor Démé, 53, Burkinabe singer-songwriter, malaria.
Ivan Dvorny, 63, Russian basketball player, Olympic champion (1972), lung cancer.
Abdulcadir Gabeire Farah, 59–60, Somali-born Polish social activist and historian, candidate for President of Somalia in 2016, bombing.
Raphael Michael Fliss, 84, American Roman Catholic prelate, Bishop of Superior (1985–2007).
Esther Golar, 71, American politician, member of the Illinois House of Representatives (since 2006), cancer.
Yoram Gross, 88, Polish-born Australian animation producer and director (The Adventures of Blinky Bill).
Vasily Ilyin, 66, Russian Soviet handball player, Olympic champion (1976).
Kenneth L. Johnson, 90, British engineer.
Charles Kellogg, 75, American Olympic skier.
Armen Movsisyan, 53, Armenian politician, Minister of Energy and Natural Resources (2001–2014), cancer.
Costas Papacostas, 75, Cypriot politician, Minister of Defence (2008–2011).
Leon Root, 86, American orthopedic surgeon and author, complications of a low blood count.
Robert E. Simon, 101, American real estate entrepreneur.
Ray Warleigh, 76, Australian-born British saxophonist and flautist, cancer.
Richard Williamson, 74, American football player (Alabama Crimson Tide) and coach (Kansas City Chiefs, Tampa Bay Buccaneers, Carolina Panthers).

22
Yogi Berra, 90, American Hall of Fame baseball player and manager (New York Yankees, New York Mets), member of 13 World Series championship teams.
Richard Dickson Cudahy, 89, American federal judge.
Edmund Fantino, 76, American neuroscientist, prostate cancer.
Elizabeth Fink, 70, American defense attorney.
Nana Gichuru, 28, Kenyan actress, traffic collision.
Asako Kishi, 91, Japanese cookery journalist.
Gerard Mach, 89, Polish Olympic sprinter.
John J. McNeill, 90, American Jesuit priest and gay rights activist.
Ali Salem, 79, Egyptian writer.
James David Santini, 78, American politician, member of the U.S. House of Representatives for Nevada at-large (1975–1983), esophageal cancer.
Al Seckel, 57, American optical illusion collector and sceptic. (death announced on this date)
Richard G. Scott, 86, American cleric, Mormon apostle.
Phyllis Tickle, 81, American religious studies author and lector, lung cancer.
Derek Ware, 77, British stuntman and actor (Doctor Who, The Italian Job), cancer.
Mokhtar Yahyaoui, 63, Tunisian judge, cardiac arrest.

23
Carlos Álvarez-Nóvoa, 75, Spanish actor (Solas).
Tor Arneberg, 87, Norwegian sailor, Olympic silver medalist (1952).
Adnan Buyung Nasution, 81, Indonesian lawyer and human rights activist, kidney failure.
Jean-Marie Drot, 86, French writer and documentary filmmaker.
Mike Gibson, 75, Australian sports journalist and broadcaster, suicide.
Dragan Holcer, 70, Croatian footballer (Hajduk Split).
Aleksandr Kolpovski, 62, Russian Soviet footballer (CSKA).
Claudia Pasini, 76, Italian Olympian
Dayananda Saraswati, 85, Indian Hindu monk and teacher (Arsha Vidya Gurukulam).
Denis Sonet, 89, French Roman Catholic priest and marriage counselor.

24
Mohan Bhandari, Indian actor, brain tumour.
Paul Carney, 72, Irish judge, High Court judge (1991–2015).
Uğur Dağdelen, 41, Turkish footballer, suicide by gunshot to head.
Bas van Duivenbode, 75, Dutch Olympic boxer.
Chuck Forsberg, 71, American computer programmer.
Kikujirō Fukushima, 94, Japanese photographer, stroke.
Assad Murtaza Gilani, 47, Pakistani politician, Member of National Assembly (2002–2008), Hajj stampede.
William W. Gullett, 92, American politician.
Michael Howard, 67, British pagan author and editor (The Cauldron).
Ellis Kaut, 94, German author (Pumuckl).
Naomi Kawashima, 54, Japanese actress, bile duct cancer.
Celina Kombani, 56, Tanzanian politician.
Alan Moore, 101, Australian war artist.
Patrick O'Donnell, 75, Canadian general, Vice Chief of the Defence Staff (1993–1995).
Hugo St-Cyr, 36, Canadian actor (Watatatow, October 1970), bone cancer.
samfree, 31, Japanese musician and producer.
Peter P. Sorokin, 84, American physicist.
Harold Stapleton, 100, Australian cricketer (New South Wales).
Ed Sukla, 72, American baseball player (California Angels), osteosarcoma.
Bilkisu Yusuf, 62, Nigerian journalist and editor, Mina stampede.
Wang Zhongshu, 89, Chinese archaeologist.

25
Carlos Anibal Altamirano Argüello, 73, Ecuadorian Roman Catholic prelate, Bishop of Azogues (since 2004).
Claudio Baggini, 79, Italian Roman Catholic prelate, Bishop of Vigevano (2000–2011).
Bill Bridges, 76, American basketball player (Atlanta Hawks, Golden State Warriors).
Dino Brugioni, 93, American imagery intelligence analyst.
Martin Colfer, Irish footballer, (Shelbourne, national team).
Bill Crawford, 79, American politician, member of Indiana House of Representatives (1972–2012).
Pat Dunne, 72, Irish football player and manager.
John Galvin, 86, American army general, Supreme Allied Commander Europe (1987–1992).
Tommie Green, 59, American basketball player (New Orleans Jazz) and college coach (Southern University).
Terje Gulbrandsen, 70, Norwegian footballer (Skeid, Vålerenga).
Hugo Gutiérrez Vega, 81, Mexican poet, diplomat and academic, Ambassador to Greece (1987–1994).
Christopher Jackson, 67, Canadian musician, lung cancer.
Henry Jacobs, 91, American sound artist and radio presenter.
Alexandr Jurečka, 24, Czech judoka, scuba diving accident.
Tom Kelley, 71, American Major League Baseball player (Cleveland Indians, Atlanta Braves).
Moti Kirschenbaum, 76, Israeli journalist and media personality.
Morten Krogh, 67, Norwegian Olympic fencer (1972).
Jim Meadowcroft, 68, English snooker player and commentator.
Richard M. Moose, 83, American politician.
Manuel Oltra, 93, Spanish composer, pneumonia.
Carol Rama, 97, Italian painter.
David Watt, 98, Australian cricketer.
Joe Wilson, 78, English footballer (Workington Reds, Wolverhampton Wanderers).
Zabeel, 28, New Zealand racehorse, leading sire in Australia (1998–1999) and New Zealand (1998–2001), namesake of the Zabeel Classic.

26
Jamal al Barzinji, 75, Iraqi-born American Muslim activist.
Chng Seng Mok, 65, Singaporean Olympic sports shooter.
Eugene D. Commins, 83, American physicist.
Tino García, 80, Nicaraguan-Puerto Rican actor, bone cancer.
Roy Kelly, 90, Canadian ice hockey player.
Kazuaki Kimura, 69, Japanese academic.
Hopingstone Lyngdoh, 86, Indian politician.
Sidney Phillips, 91, American Marine (1941–1945), physician and author.
Ulla Puolanne, 84, Finnish politician, Deputy Minister of Finance (1987-1991).
Paul Reed, 96, American artist.
Fred Ridgway, 92, English cricketer (Kent, England).
Homa Rousta, 71, Iranian actress, cancer.
Ana Seneviratne, 88, Sri Lankan diplomat and Inspector General of Police.

27
Syed Ahmed, 73, Indian politician, Governor of Jharkhand (2011–2015) and Manipur (2015), cancer.
Howard A. Anderson, Jr., 95, American visual effects artist (Star Trek: The Original Series, Tobruk) and title designer (The Brady Bunch).
Albert Blan, 85, English rugby league player (Swinton, national team).
Odd Blomdal, 88, Norwegian judge and civil servant.
Roland Collins, 97, English painter.
Norm Defelice, 82, Canadian ice hockey player (Boston Bruins).
Wilton Felder, 75, American saxophonist (The Crusaders) and session bassist (Motown).
John Guillermin, 89, British film director and producer (The Towering Inferno, King Kong, Shaft in Africa), heart attack.
In Style, 20, Canadian show jumping horse, euthanized.
Pietro Ingrao, 100, Italian politician, President of the Chamber of Deputies (1976–1979), journalist and partisan.
Hugh Jackson, 75, Irish golfer.
Denise Lor, 86, American singer ("If I Give My Heart to You") and actress.
Kallen Pokkudan, 78, Indian environmental activist and writer.
Richard Rainwater, 71, American investor.
Torgeir Stensrud, 66, Norwegian businessman, cancer.
Fred Stickel, 93, American newspaper publisher (The Oregonian).
Frank Tyson, 85, English cricketer (Northamptonshire, England), journalist and commentator.

28
Sir Peter Abbott, 73, British admiral, Vice-Chief of the Defence Staff (1997–2001), cancer.
Frank Martinus Arion, 78, Dutch Antillean author.
Siert Bruins, 94, Dutch war criminal.
Michael Burgess, 70, Canadian tenor, skin cancer.
Claudia Bär, 35, German slalom canoer, European champion (2008, 2011), leukemia.
Catherine E. Coulson, 71, American actress and production assistant (Twin Peaks, Star Trek II: The Wrath of Khan, Eraserhead), cancer.
Viren Dangwal, 68, Indian poet, academic, and journalist.
Louis Armand Desrochers, 87, Canadian lawyer and academic.
Carlos Diaz, 57, American baseball player (Los Angeles Dodgers, New York Mets).
Alexander Faris, 94, Northern Irish composer.
Frankie Ford, 76, American singer ("Sea Cruise").
Valerie Ganz, 79, Welsh painter.
Sjur Hopperstad, 84, Norwegian politician, county mayor of Sogn og Fjordane.
Walter Dale Miller, 89, American politician, Governor of South Dakota (1993–1995).
Simo Rinne, 74, Finnish Olympic speed skater.
Karsten Schwan, 63, American computer scientist, cancer.
Ignacio Zoco, 76, Spanish footballer (Real Madrid).

29
Nawwaf bin Abdulaziz Al Saud, 83, Saudi Arabian prince, director of General Intelligence Directorate (2001–2005).
Sorin Avram, 72, Romanian Olympic football player (1964) and coach (Bacău).
Al Benecick, 78, American football player (Saskatchewan Roughriders).
Claude Dubar, 69, French sociologist.
Mauro Ferri, 95, Italian politician.
Rick Foley, 70, Canadian ice hockey player (Chicago Blackhawks, Philadelphia Flyers, Detroit Red Wings).
Gillian Gear, 72, English historian and archivist (Barnet Museum).
Benjamin Hutto, 67, American organist, choirmaster and academic, gallbladder cancer.
Susumu Ito, 96, American cell biologist and WW2 veteran (442nd Regiment).
Ram Kapse, 81, Indian politician, Lieutenant Governor of Andaman and Nicobar Islands (2004–2006).
Hellmuth Karasek, 81, German literary critic and journalist (Der Spiegel).
William Kerslake, 85, American NASA engineer and wrestler.
Gilles Mayer, 86, Canadian ice hockey player (Toronto Maple Leafs).
Sybil C. Mobley, 89, American academic.
Gamaliel Onosode, 82, Nigerian businessman and politician.
Burton Raffel, 87, American literary translator and writer.
Soaring Softly, 20, American racehorse, paddock accident.
Jean Ter-Merguerian, 79, French violinist.
Pat Woodell, 71, American actress (Petticoat Junction), cancer.
Phil Woods, 83, American saxophonist ("Just the Way You Are"), emphysema.

30
Allen Aldridge, 71, American football player (Toronto Argonauts, Houston Oilers, Cleveland Browns).
Guido Altarelli, 74, Italian theoretical physicist.
Frank Battig, 79, Austrian Olympic modern pentathlete (1960) and fencer (1968).
Pierre de Bellefeuille, 92, Canadian politician.
Caio César, 27, Brazilian voice actor (Harry Potter) and policeman, shot.
Claude Dauphin, 64, French business executive, co-founder and CEO of Trafigura, cancer.
Morris E. Fine, 97, American scientist.
Kelly Gissendaner, 47, American convicted malice murderer, executed by lethal injection.
Göran Hägg, 68, Swedish writer and literary critic, heart attack.
Antje Huber, 91, German politician, Federal Minister for Youth, Family and Health (1976–1982).
Svein B. Manum, 89, Norwegian botanist.
Eric Martin, 90, English cricketer.
Al Romine, 84, American football player (Green Bay Packers, Chicago Bears, Denver Broncos).
Donald Seawell, 103, American theater producer and newspaper publisher.
Alfred Schickel, 82, German historian.
Rick Talan, 54, Dutch footballer (AZ, Vitesse Arnhem), brain cancer.
Ian Thwaites, 72, English cricketer.

References

2015-09
 09